Hemipsectra is a genus of moths of the family Erebidae. The genus was erected by George Hampson in 1891.

The Global Lepidoptera Names Index gives this name as a synonym of Gesonia Walker, [1859].

Species
Hemipsectra fallax (Butler, 1879) Japan
Hemipsectra plumipars (Hampson, 1891) Nilgiri Mountains of India

References

Calpinae
Moth genera